#LoveJo is the debut extended play (EP) by American recording artist JoJo. It was released for digital download on February 14, 2014, as a free Valentine's Day gift for JoJo's fans for all their support over the years. It is JoJo's first official release since she was released from her contract with Blackground Records and signed to Atlantic Records. The four-track EP includes three covers of various classic songs including songs of Atlantic-affiliated artists Anita Baker and Phil Collins.

Composition
The extended play contributed the overall elements of sounds between pop and R&B; however, the EP dips into other genres such gospel and soul music. The EP opens with a spoken intro which is a poem, written by author Aeni, while R&B singer Marsha Ambrosius produces the tracks melody. JoJo speaks in a sultry voice "that sucks you right in", JoJo says. "Rest your head and close your eyes / Everything will be okay / For when you wake with the sweet sunrise / It will be a brand new day."

The track that contains a cover was this jazzy-R&B song "Caught Up in the Rapture", which was recorded by American R&B singer Anita Baker that was included from her second album Rapture (1986). The song was written by Gary Glenn and Dianne Quander, while Da Internz handled the song's production. Idolator said the song "dissolves into glitchy loops" before transitioning into the next track, a cover of Phil Collins' song "Take Me Home". Time magazine called JoJo's version "a clear standout" on the EP, continuing calling it "all militant stomp buried under ambient noise; her voice soars and crashes over the glitchy, stuttering beat. It's not the most obvious love song, but who cares – it's good." The song lyrics refer to a patient in a mental institution, and it is based on the novel One Flew Over the Cuckoo's Nest. The EP finishes with JoJo's "gospel-inflected" rendition of the "spiritual" 1991 song "Glory" inspired by opera singer Kathleen Battle. Produced by JoJo's long-time friend and vocal coach Stevie Mackey, "Glory" sees JoJo's "soothing vocals soar and really bring out the goosebumps teasing us of her outstanding talent and what is to come".

Promotion
Following its surprise release, JoJo performed tracks from the EP for the first time live at the 2014 South by Southwest music festival on March 15. her second live performance of the tracks was on March 22, 2014, during VH1's Save the Music Foundation's "Family Day", and that same night at Perez Hilton's birthday party.

Critical reception
Overall the extended play has received rave reviews from music critics. Sam Lansky from Time magazine said that the EP sees JoJo "interpreting classic songs with inventive production and, as ever, chill-inducing vocals". He noted that JoJo's time away from the limelight, due to her constant label drama, has given her "the raw talent to rule 2014". In writing for Idolator, Christina Lee said that the EP "is respectful of R&B tradition and is tastefully modern at the same time". Joe Hopkins of UK online magazine Hit the Floor gave the mixtape a 9/10 rating, writing, "JoJo's voice has clearly developed from her 'Leave (Get Out)' days but still remains light and delicate." In the review Hopkins said, "The shifts between falsetto and the runs are exquisite. However, not to forget the production from Da Internz which is completely ingenious." Nylon magazine's Liza Darwin also went on to compare the EP to JoJo's early beginnings, stating "It's a far cry from 'Leave (Get Out),' but we're not mad about it... The bottom line? This girl is good, and we can't wait to hear what she's serving up next." KempireRadio called the EP a "reminder of what we have been missing from the music scene".

Track listing

Credits and personnel
Credits adapted from JoJo's Soundcloud page.

JoJo – lead vocals
Da Internz – producer
Brian Ziff – art direction, photography
Lisa Zogalis – hair stylist
Chrissy Zogalis – make up
Joey Thao – stylist
Lee England Jr.  – violin

Stevie Mackey – vocal production, producer
Affordable Healthcare – music
Kevin Randolph – piano
Tony "Chicago" Russell – bass
Zach Nicholls – recording, mixing
Marsha Ambrosius – additional production
Mark Pelli – guitar

References

External links
The Mixtape on Audiomack

2014 debut EPs
Albums free for download by copyright owner
Albums produced by Da Internz
Atlantic Records EPs
JoJo (singer) albums